Radka Maxová (born 2 December 1968 in Pardubice) is a Czech politician who was elected as a Member of the European Parliament in 2019.

Political career 
In parliament, Maxová has been serving on as the vice-chair of the Committee on Women’s Rights and Gender Equality (since 2022), as a member of the  Special Committee on foreign interference in all democratic processes in the European Union, including disinformation (since 2021) and as a substitute of the Committee on the Environment, Public Health and Food Safety.

In addition to her committee assignments, Maxová is part of the Parliament's delegations to the EU-Chile Joint Parliamentary Committee; to the Euronest Parliamentary Assembly and to the EU-Moldova Parliamentary Association Committee . 

She is also a member of the European Parliament Intergroup on LGBT Rights, the European Parliament Intergroup on Disability and a supporter of the MEP Alliance for Mental Health.

In October 2020 she left ANO 2011 and joined Czech Social Democratic Party as an independent.

References

MEPs for the Czech Republic 2019–2024
ANO 2011 MEPs
ANO 2011 politicians
Women MEPs for the Czech Republic
Members of the Chamber of Deputies of the Czech Republic (2013–2017)
Members of the Chamber of Deputies of the Czech Republic (2017–2021)
1968 births
Living people
Politicians from Pardubice
University of Chemistry and Technology, Prague alumni